Sportivo y Biblioteca Atenas is a football club from Río Cuarto, Córdoba, Argentina. They were founded in 1916. As of the 2012/13 season they play in the Torneo Argentino B (4th level).

In 2009/10 they reached the second phase of the Argentino B.

See also
Argentine football league system

References

Football clubs in Córdoba Province, Argentina